The 2023 Production Alliance Group 300 was the 2nd stock car race of the 2023 NASCAR Xfinity Series, and the 24th iteration of the event. The race took place at Auto Club Speedway in Fontana, California, a  permanent tri-oval shaped superspeedway. The race was originally scheduled to be held on Saturday, February 25, 2023, but due to constant rain showers, the race was postponed until Sunday, February 26, immediately following the Pala Casino 400 Cup Series race on the same day. 

The race took the scheduled 150 laps to complete. John Hunter Nemechek, driving for Joe Gibbs Racing, dominated the final stages of the race, and earned his third career NASCAR Xfinity Series win, along with his first of the season. To fill out the podium, Sam Mayer, driving for JR Motorsports, and Justin Allgaier, also driivng for JR Motorsports, would finish 2nd and 3rd, respectively.

This was also the final Xfinity Series race to be held on the 2.0 mile version of Auto Club Speedway, as the track will be renovated into a 0.5 mile short track in 2023.

Background 
It is also used for open wheel racing events. The racetrack is located near the former locations of Ontario Motor Speedway and Riverside International Raceway. The track is owned and operated by International Speedway Corporation and is the only track owned by ISC to have naming rights sold. The speedway is served by the nearby Interstate 10 and Interstate 15 freeways as well as a Metrolink station located behind the backstretch.

Entry list 

 (R) denotes rookie driver.
 (i) denotes driver who is ineligible for series driver points.

Starting lineup 
Practice and qualifying were scheduled to be held on Saturday, February 25, at 9:05 AM PST, and 9:35 AM PST, but were both cancelled due to constant rain showers. The starting lineup would be determined by a performance-based metric system. As a result, Austin Hill, driving for Richard Childress Racing, would earn the pole. Garrett Smithley and Ryan Vargas would fail to qualify.

Race results 
Stage 1 Laps: 35

Stage 2 Laps: 35

Stage 3 Laps: 80

Standings after theace 

Drivers' Championship standings

Note: Only the first 12 positions are included for the driver standings.

References 

NASCAR races at Auto Club Speedway
Production Alliance Group 300
Production Alliance Group 300